Kim Mu-saeng (16 March 1943 – 16 April 2005) was a South Korean actor.

Early life and education
Kim was born in the town of Daesan, Seosan in March 1943. He studied at Dongguk University in Seoul, beginning his career as a voice actor for Tongyang Broadcasting Company (now KBS) in 1963.

Career
Kim made his on-screen acting debut in 1969, and went on to make over 100 appearances in film and television, his final role being in the television drama series Save the Last Dance for Me, which ended on 2 January 2005. In 2004, Kim appeared in a television commercial with his youngest son Kim Joo-hyuk, who was also an actor.

Personal life
In July 2004, Kim travelled to Kumgangsan resort in North Korea for the tenth round of inter-Korean family reunions, where he met his maternal uncle Jang Gyeong-su.

Death
Kim died at the Samsung Medical Center in Ilwon from pneumonia on 16 April 2005, having suffered from lung disease for the previous two years and spending a month in a coma. He is survived by his wife and his eldest son; the younger died in a traffic accident in October 2017.

Legacy
In December 2005, Kim received a posthumous "Special Contribution Award" at the SBS Performance Awards ceremony.

Partial filmography

References

External links 
 
 
 

1943 births
2005 deaths
Dongguk University alumni
South Korean male film actors
South Korean male television actors
Gim clan of Gyeongju
Deaths from pneumonia in South Korea